Gustave Diamond (January 29, 1928 – October 30, 2021) was a United States district judge of the United States District Court for the Western District of Pennsylvania. Diamond died on October 30, 2021, at his home in McMurray, Pennsylvania, at the age of 93.

Education and career
Born in Burgettstown, Pennsylvania, Diamond was in the United States Navy from 1946 to 1948. He received an Artium Baccalaureus degree from Duke University in 1951 and a Juris Doctor from Duquesne University School of Law in 1956. He was a law clerk to Judge Rabe Ferguson Marsh Jr. of the United States District Court for the Western District of Pennsylvania from 1956 to 1961. He was an Assistant United States Attorney of the Western District of Pennsylvania from 1961 to 1963. He was the United States Attorney for the Western District of Pennsylvania from 1963 to 1969. He was in private practice in Pittsburgh, Pennsylvania from 1969 to 1975. He was in private practice in Washington, Pennsylvania from 1976 to 1978.

Federal judicial service
Diamond was nominated by President Jimmy Carter on March 22, 1978, to the United States District Court for the Western District of Pennsylvania, to a seat vacated by Judge Edward Dumbauld. He was confirmed by the United States Senate on May 1, 1978, and received his commission on May 2, 1978. He served as Chief Judge from 1992 to 1994. He assumed senior status on January 31, 1994. He was succeeded by Judge Robert J. Cindrich.

References

Sources

1928 births
2021 deaths
Judges of the United States District Court for the Western District of Pennsylvania
United States district court judges appointed by Jimmy Carter
20th-century American judges
United States Navy sailors
Duke University alumni
Duquesne University School of Law alumni
United States Attorneys for the Western District of Pennsylvania
Assistant United States Attorneys
21st-century American judges
People from Washington County, Pennsylvania
Military personnel from Pennsylvania